This article describes the history of Suffolk, the English county.

Historical setting

Anglo-Saxon control

The county of Suffolk (Sudfole, Suthfolc, meaning 'southern folk') was formed from the south part of the kingdom of East Anglia which had been settled by the Angles in the latter half of the 5th century. The most important Anglo-Saxon settlements appear to have been made at Sudbury and Ipswich. Before the end of the Norman dynasty, strongholds had arisen at Eye, Clare, Walton and Framlingham. Probably the establishment of Suffolk as a separate shire was scarcely completed before the Conquest, and although it was reckoned as distinct from Norfolk in the Domesday Survey of 1086, the fiscal administration of Norfolk and Suffolk remained under a single sheriff until 1575. The boundary of the county has undergone very little change, though its area has been considerably affected by coast erosion. Parts of Gorleston and Thetford, which formerly belonged to the ancient county of Suffolk, are now within the administrative county of Norfolk, and other slight alterations of the administrative boundary have been made. Under the Local Government Act of 1888 Suffolk was divided into the two administrative counties of East and West Suffolk.

Land division

At first the whole shire lay within the diocese of Dunwich which was founded approximately 631. In 673 a new bishopric was established at Elmham to comprise the whole of Norfolk which had formerly been included in the see of Dunwich. The latter came to an end with the incursion of the Danes, and on the revival of Christianity in this district Suffolk was included in the diocese of Elmham, subsequently removed from South Elmham to Thetford and thence to Norwich. The archdeaconry of Sudbury was transferred by the ecclesiastical commissioners to the diocese of Ely. This archdeaconry had been separated from the original archdeaconry of Suffolk in 1127. In 1256 the latter included thirteen deaneries which have since been subdivided, so that-at present it contains eighteen deaneries; Sudbury archdeaconry which comprised eight deaneries in 1256 now (1911) includes eleven. There were also three districts under jurisdiction of Canterbury and one under that of Rochester.

The shire court was held at Ipswich. In 1831 the whole county contained twenty-one hundreds and three municipal boroughs. Most of these hundreds were identical with those of the Domesday Survey, but in 1086 Babergh was rated as two hundreds, Cosford, Ipswich and Parham as half hundreds and Samford as a hundred and a half. Hoxne hundred was formerly known as Bishops hundred and the vills which were included later in Thredling hundred were within Claydon hundred in 1086. Two large ecclesiastical liberties extended over more than half of the county; that of St Edmund included the hundreds of Risbridge, Thedwastre, Thingoe, Cosford, Lackford and Blackbourn in which the kings writ did not run, and St Aethelreda of Ely claimed a similar privilege in the hundreds of Carleford, Colneis, Plumesgate, Loes, Wilford and Thredling. Among others who had large lands in the county with co-extensive jurisdiction were the lords of the honor of Clare, earls of Gloucester and Hereford and the lords of the honor of Eye, held successively by the Bigods, the Uffords and the De la Poles, earls of Suffolk. The Wingfields, Bacons and Herveys have been closely connected with the county.

For the purposes of civil government the Liberty of Saint Edmund and the remainder (or "body") of the county were quite distinct, each providing a separate grand jury to the county assizes. The county was further divided into "geldable" land, in which fines and forfeitures were payable to the Crown, and the liberties and franchises where they were payable to the lord of the liberty. The geldable lands were divided into two quarter sessions divisions: Bungay (Hundreds of Blything, Mutford And Launditch and Wangford); and Ipswich (Bosmere and Claydon, Hartismere, Hoxne, Samford and Stow). The liberty of St Ethelredra held sessions at Woodbridge while those of the St Edmund were held at Bury St Edmunds. By the early nineteenth century these were being referred to simply as Beccles, Bury St Edmunds, Ipswich and Woodbridge Divisions. The three quarter sessions divisions of Beccles, Ipswich and Woodbridge were combined to form a single division in 1860. From that date Suffolk had eastern and western divisions with sessions held at Ipswich and Bury St Edmunds respectively. These became the basis for the two administrative counties of East Suffolk and West Suffolk in 1890.

Danelaw through English Civil War
Suffolk suffered severely from Danish incursions, and after the Treaty of Wedmore became a part of the Danelagh. In 1173 the Earl of Leicester landed at Walton with an army of Flemings and was joined by Hugh Bigod against Henry II. In 1317 and the succeeding years a great part of the county was in arms for Thomas of Lancaster. Queen Isabella and Mortimer having landed at Walton found all the district in their favour. In 1330 the county was raised to suppress the supporters of the Earl of Kent; and again in 1381 there was a serious rising of the peasantry chiefly in the neighbourhood of Bury St Edmunds. Although the county was for the most part Yorkist it took little part in the Wars of the Roses. In 1525 the artisans of the south strongly resisted Henry VIII's forced loan. It was from Suffolk that Mary drew the army which supported her claim to the throne. In the Civil Wars the county was for the most part parliamentarian, and joined the Association of the Eastern Counties for defence against the Papists.

Politics and economy
The county was constantly represented in parliament by two knights from 1290, until the Reform Bill of 1832 gave four members to Suffolk, at the same time disfranchising the boroughs of Dunwich, Orford and Aldeburgh. Suffolk was early among the most populous of English counties, doubtless owing to its proximity to the continent. Fishing fleets have left its ports to bring back cod and ling from Iceland and herring and mackerel from the North Sea. From the 14th to the 17th century it was among the chief manufacturing counties of England owing to its cloth-weaving industry, which was at the height of its prosperity during the 15th century. In the 17th and 18th centuries its agricultural resources were utilized to provide the rapidly growing metropolis with food. In the following century various textile industries, such as the manufacture of sail-cloth, coconut fibre, horse-hair and clothing were established; silk-weavers migrated to Suffolk from Spitalfields, and early in the 19th century an important china factory flourished at Lowestoft.

Relics
Of monastic remains the most important are those of the great Benedictine abbey of Bury St Edmunds; the college of Clare, originally a cell to Bec Abbey in Normandy and afterwards to St Peters Westminster, converted into a college of secular canons in the reign of Henry VI, still retaining much of its ancient architecture, and now used as a boarding-school; the Decorated gateway of the Augustinian order priory of Butley; and the remains of the Grey Friars monastery at Dunwich.

A peculiarity of the church architecture is the use of flint for purposes of ornamentation, often of a very elaborate kind, especially on the porches and parapets of the towers. Another characteristic is the round towers, which are confined to East Anglia, but are considerably more numerous in Norfolk than in Suffolk, the principal being those of Little Saxham and Herringfleet, both good examples of Norman. It is questionable whether there are any remains of pre-Norman architecture in the county. The Decorated is well represented, but by far the greater proportion of the churches are Perpendicular Gothic, fine examples of which are so numerous that it is hard to select examples. But the church of Blythburgh in the east and the exquisite ornate building at Lavenham in the west may be noted as typical, while the church of Long Melford, another fine example, should be mentioned on account of its remarkable lady chapel.

Remains of old castles include part of the walls of Bungay, the ancient stronghold of the Bigods; the picturesque ruins of Mettingham, built by John de Norwich in the reign of Edward III; Wingfield, surrounded by a deep moat, with the turret walls and the drawbridge still existing; the splendid ruin of Framlingham, with high and massive walls, founded in the 6th century, but restored in the 12th; the outlines of the extensive fortress of Clare Castle, anciently the baronial residence of the earls of Clare; and the fine Norman keep of Orford Castle, on an eminence overlooking the sea. Among the many fine residences within the county there are several interesting examples of domestic architecture of the reigns of Henry VIII and Elizabeth. Hengrave Hall (c. 1530), north-west from Bury St Edmunds, is a noteworthy example an exceedingly picturesque building of brick and stone, enclosing a courtyard. Another is Helmingham Hall, a Tudor mansion of brick, surrounded by a moat crossed by a drawbridge. West Stow Manor is also Tudor; its gatehouse is fine, but the mansion has been adapted into a farmhouse.

The county has a number of Martello towers along its stretch of coastline, most of which were constructed during the first decade of the 19th century to guard against a potential invasion by Napoleon Bonaparte's France.

See also
Hundreds of Suffolk
Suffolk History Hub

Notes

 
Suffolk
Bigod family